Cailaco is a town in Cailaco Subdistrict in the Bobonaro District of East Timor.

References

Populated places in East Timor
Bobonaro Municipality